Luis Felipe López (born December 19, 1974) is a Dominican former professional basketball player. He starred as a high school player and for the St. John's Red Storm in college basketball. López played for four seasons in the National Basketball Association (NBA). He has played for teams in a half dozen countries, as well as in the Continental Basketball Association (CBA) in the U.S. Most recently, he has been a broadcaster with Spanish-language networks. His life story was the subject of an ESPN 30 for 30 documentary entitled The Dominican Dream.

Early life and high school career
López's father, who played amateur baseball in the Dominican Republic, and his family immigrated to the U.S. when he was 14. López played high school basketball at Rice High School in New York City, where he followed New York high school player Dean Meminger in becoming one of the most highly touted recruits in U.S. high school history. The  guard made many All-American lists in 1994, earning Player of the Year honors from Gatorade, USA Today, Parade, and many others.

Collegiate career
López appeared on the cover of Sports Illustrated before he had played his first college game. He also appeared with Jim Brown and Jackie Joyner-Kersee at a televised town meeting on race and sports along with then-president Bill Clinton. López was the only Latino onstage during the discussion.

López finished his freshman season for the St. John's Red Storm with an 17.8-point-per-game scoring average. He earned a spot on the All-Big East Rookie Team and All-Big East Third Team. His numbers dipped slightly the next two years, bottoming out at 15.9 ppg as a junior. As a senior he averaged 17.6 ppg and garnered All-Big East First Team honors. He finished his career with 1,927 points, placing him fourth all-time in St. John's history behind former players Chris Mullin, Malik Sealy, and D'Angelo Harrison and sixth in Big East history with 1,222 conference points, while also ranking seventh all time in steals, 14th in assists, and 20th in rebounds. He also holds the St. John's record for most three-pointers made in a single season (60) and in a career (148).

Professional career
López was selected by the San Antonio Spurs with the 24th pick in the 1998 NBA draft and was immediately traded, along with Carl Herrera, to the Vancouver Grizzlies for point guard Antonio Daniels. López's drafting into the NBA was cause for great celebration in the heavily Dominican community of Washington Heights in New York City. He played 112 games for the Grizzlies before being traded to the Washington Wizards along with Dennis Scott, Cherokee Parks, and Obinna Ekezie in exchange for free agent Isaac Austin on August 22, 2000. López went on to sign as a free agent with both the Minnesota Timberwolves and Dallas Mavericks, although he never played a regular season game for the Mavs. He trained with the Orlando Magic and Los Angeles Clippers in the first months of the 2005–06 NBA season before signing a contract with Lleida.

López holds career NBA averages of 5.8 points, 2.4 rebounds and one assist per game.

Career statistics

NBA

Source

Regular season

|-
| style="text-align:left;"| 
| style="text-align:left;"| Vancouver
| 47 || 32 || 25.9 || .446 || .273 || .644 || 3.5 || 1.3 || 1.0 || 0.3 || 9.3
|-
| style="text-align:left;"| 
| style="text-align:left;"| Vancouver
| 65 || 0 || 12.0 || .425 || .167 || .615 || 1.9 || 0.7 || 0.5 || 0.3 || 4.5
|-
| style="text-align:left;" rowspan=2 | 
| style="text-align:left;"| Washington
| 47 || 38 || 23.6 || .436 || .207 || .732 || 3.4 || 1.6 || 0.9 || 0.4 || 8.1
|-
| style="text-align:left;"| Minnesota
| 23 || 10 || 19.9 || .454 || .565 || .576 || 3.2 || 1.5 || 0.9 || 0.5 || 7.4
|-
| style="text-align:left;"| 
| style="text-align:left;"| Minnesota
| 67 || 0 || 8.7 || .378 || .424 || .673 || 1.2 || 0.6 || 0.3 || 0.0 || 2.5
|- class="sortbottom"
| style="text-align:center;" colspan="2"| Career
| 249 || 80 || 16.6 || .432 || .327 || .659 || 2.4 || 1.0 || 0.6 || 0.2 || 5.8

Playoffs

|-
| style="text-align:left;"| 2001
| style="text-align:left;"| Minnesota
| 4 || 0 || 13.8 || .318 || .200 || .667 || 2.8 || 1.3 || 1.0 || .0 || 4.3
|-
| style="text-align:left;"| 2002
| style="text-align:left;"| Minnesota
| 3 || 0 || 10.0 || .250 || .500 || .500 || .3 || .3 || .3 || .0 || 1.3
|- class="sortbottom"
| style="text-align:center;" colspan="2"| Career
| 7 || 0 || 12.1 || .308 || .286 || .600 || 1.7 || .9 || .7 || .0 || 3.0

References 

5. Beat Nuts-Get Funky https://genius.com/The-beatnuts-get-funky-lyrics

External links
 "Shoot the Moon", New Yorker article by Susan Orlean

1974 births
Living people
Albany Patroons players
American people of Dominican Republic descent
Dominican Republic expatriate basketball people in Canada
Dominican Republic expatriate basketball people in Germany
EWE Baskets Oldenburg players
McDonald's High School All-Americans
Minnesota Timberwolves players
National Basketball Association players from the Dominican Republic
Orlando Magic players
Parade High School All-Americans (boys' basketball)
San Antonio Spurs draft picks
Shooting guards
Sportspeople from Santo Domingo
St. John's Red Storm men's basketball players
Vancouver Grizzlies players
Washington Wizards players
Afro-Dominican (Dominican Republic)
Dominican Republic basketball players